Lisa is a 2001 French-Swiss romantic drama war film directed by Pierre Grimblat based on the novel Théâtre dans la nuit by Patrick Cauvin, starring Jeanne Moreau, Marion Cotillard, Benoît Magimel and Sagamore Stévenin. It was released theatrically in France by Capitol Films on 10 January 2001.

Plot
After he finds an uncompleted film from 1939 called "Princess Marushka", Sam, a filmmaker, becomes intrigued with the young actor Sylvain Marceau. Sam decides to make a documentary about Sylvain and interviews those who knew him, including an old lady named Lisa Morain. Through her interview, Sam learns the story of Lisa and Sylvain's doomed love affair during World War II.

Cast
Jeanne Moreau as Lisa Morain
Marion Cotillard as Young Lisa
Benoît Magimel as Sam
Sagamore Stévenin as Sylvain Marceau
 as Henriette
Michel Jonasz as Benjamin
 as Marina
 as Simone
Johan Leysen as Professor Seyden
Micky El Mazroui as Samy
 as Castellain
Marisa Berenson as Princess Maruschka
Pierre Dherte as Edouard
Filip Peeters as Colonel von Boll
Hélène Theunissen as Mrs. Ergolsheim
 as Serge Mauro

References

External links 
 
 

2001 films
2001 romantic drama films
2000s war drama films
French epic films
French romantic drama films
Swiss romantic drama films
2000s French-language films
Films based on French novels
Films set in France
Films set in the 1930s
Films shot in Brussels
Romantic epic films
War romance films
French World War II films
French war drama films
French-language Swiss films
Swiss World War II films
Swiss war drama films
2000s French films